Kozlovka is a rural locality (a village) in Mstyora Urban Settlement, Vyaznikovsky District, Vladimir Oblast, Russia. The population was 67 as of 2010. There is 1 street.

Geography 
Kozlovka is located 28 km northwest of Vyazniki (the district's administrative centre) by road. Barskoye Tatarovo is the nearest rural locality.

References 

Rural localities in Vyaznikovsky District